HMCS Edmonton is a  that has served in the Canadian Forces since 1997. Edmonton is the fourth ship of its class, all of which were built for the Maritime Coastal Defence Vessel Project. The ship is the first vessel to use the designation HMCS Edmonton. The ship is assigned to Maritime Forces Pacific (MARPAC) and is homeported at CFB Esquimalt.

Design and description
The Kingston class was designed to fill the minesweeper, coastal patrol and reserve training needs of the Canadian Forces, replacing the s, s and Royal Canadian Mounted Police coastal launches in those roles. In order to perform these varied duties the Kingston-class vessels are designed to carry up to three  ISO containers with power hookups on the open deck aft in order to embark mission-specific payloads. The seven module types available for embarkation include four route survey, two mechanical minesweeping and one bottom inspection modules.

The coastal defence vessels are powered by four Jeumont ANR-53-50 alternators coupled to four Wärtsilä UD 23V12 diesel engines creating . Two LIPS Z-drive azimuth thrusters are driven by two Jeumont CI 560L motors creating  and the Z drives can be rotated 360°.

The Kingston class is equipped with two Sperry Marine Bridgemaster "E" navigational radars, one using the I band and the other operating in the E and F bands. In 2017 Edmonton will be fitted with the Sperry Marine navigation suite, including updated NAVIGAT X gyrocompasses and NAVITWIN IV heading management system and repeaters. The vessels are equipped to carry an AN/SQS-511 towed side scan sonar for minesweeping and a Remote-control Mine Hunting System (RMHS). The vessels were equipped with one Bofors 40 mm/60 calibre Mk 5C gun and two M2 machine guns. The 40 mm gun was declared obsolete and removed from the vessels in 2014. Some of them ended up as museum pieces and on display at naval reserve installations across Canada. The Kingston-class coastal defence vessels have a regular complement of 33, with bunks available (using the accommodations payload) for up to 47.

Service history
Edmonton was laid down on 8 August 1995 by Halifax Shipyards Ltd. at Halifax, Nova Scotia, and was launched on 31 October 1996. The vessel was commissioned into the Canadian Forces on 21 June 1997 at Esquimalt, British Columbia and carries the hull number MM 703.

In June–July 2002, Edmonton and sister ships  and  participated in the naval exercise RIMPAC 2002 off Hawaii.

In September 2013, Edmonton and sister ship  sailed from Esquimalt for Operation Caribbe, the first such deployment of west coast Kingston class. On 25 October, Edmonton and her embarked United States Coast Guard Law Enforcement Detachment (LEDET) intercepted a panga-style vessel and seized  of cocaine. Two days later, Edmonton and her LEDET intercepted a second vessel and recovered  of cocaine that had been jettisoned during the chase. After the 40 mm gun was declared obsolete in 2014 and removed from Edmonton, Edmontons mount was donated to the Edmonton Garrison Memorial Golf and Curling Club in April 2018.

In February 2016 Edmonton and Saskatoon sailed from Esquimalt to join Operation Caribbe. On 25 March, in conjunction with the United States Navy destroyer , Edmonton intercepted drug smugglers in international waters off the coast of Central America. After being stopped, the smuggling vessel attempted to dump its cargo overboard. Edmonton, working with a LEDET detachment, recovered 27 bales of cocaine equalling . Edmonton and Saskatoon returned to Esquimalt on 29 April 2016. On 6 October,  and Edmonton left Esquimalt to participate in Operation Caribbe along the Pacific coast. Between 15 and 18 November, Edmonton disrupted three separate shipments of illegal narcotics. On 15 November, Edmonton recovered  from the ocean after a fishing vessel was intercepted by the United States Coast Guard. Brandon and Edmonton returned to Esquimalt on 16 December.

From August to September 2017, Edmonton and Yellowknife sailed to the Arctic Ocean to perform surveillance of Canada's northern waters as part of Operation Limpid. They returned to Esquimalt on 5 October. In 2018, Edmonton deployed south into the eastern Pacific Ocean as part of Operation Caribbe alongside sister ship . Edmonton and Whitehorse returned to Esquimalt on 3 May. The smugglers escaped and during the seizure, the ship suffered a loss of propulsion. The ship returned to Esquimalt on 17 December.

In 2022, Edmonton was one of the RCN vessels sent to take part in the multinational naval exercise RIMPAC 2022. In February 2023, the vessel was deployed off the Pacific coasts of Central and South America as part of Operation Caribbe.

References

Notes

Citations

Sources

External links

  
 Official Twitter

Fleet of the Royal Canadian Navy
Kingston-class coastal defence vessels
1996 ships
Ships built in Nova Scotia